Spranger Harrison (29 June 1857 – 18 June 1927) was a South African first-class cricketer. He played for Transvaal in the 1889–90 Currie Cup.

References

External links
 

1857 births
1927 deaths
South African cricketers
Gauteng cricketers
Cricketers from Lancashire